Waterloo Sunset is an album by Barb Jungr released in 2003 (See 2003 in music).

Track listing 
"Do You Play Guitar?" (Barb Jungr, Adrian York) – 3:53
"High Water (for Charley Patton)" (Bob Dylan) – 5:49
Originally from the Bob Dylan album Love and Theft (2001)
"Cathy's Clown" (Don Everly, Phil Everly) – 3:35
Originally from the Everly Brothers album The Everly Brothers' Best (1959)
"This Masquerade" (Leon Russell) – 5:09
Originally from the Howard Roberts album Sounds (1970)
Version performed by Leon Russell originally from his album Carney (1972)
"The Great Valerio" (Richard Thompson) – 3:49
Originally from the Richard and Linda Thompson album I Want to See the Bright Lights Tonight (1974)
"When Do the Bells Ring for Me?" (Charles De Forest) – 2:54
Originally from the Tony Bennett album Astoria: Portrait of the Artist (1990)
"Written Down in the Dark Again" (Christine Collister, Jungr) – 5:26
"Like a Rolling Stone" (Dylan) – 6:03
Originally from the Bob Dylan album Highway 61 Revisited (1965)
"Lipstick Lips Lament" (Russell Churney, Jungr) – 4:22
"Laugh, Clown, Laugh" (Ted Fiorito, Sam M Lewis, Joe Young) – 3:30
Originally the title theme from the film Laugh, Clown, Laugh (dir Herbert Brenon) (1928)
"Waterloo Sunset" (Ray Davies) – 4:32
Originally from the Kinks album Something Else by the Kinks (1967)
Earlier version performed by Barb Jungr featured on her album Bare (1999)
"The Joker" (Eddie Curtis, Ahmet Ertegun, Steve Miller) – 5:35
Originally from the Steve Miller Band album The Joker (1973)

Personnel

Musicians
Barb Jungr - vocals, harmonica
Matt Backer - guitar
Adrian York - piano
Stuart Hall - violin (on track 5)
Geoff Gascoyne - double bass
Nic France - drums

Other personnel 
Calum Malcolm - engineer, mixing
Kevan Gallagher - engineer
Ben - post-production
John Haxby - design, photography
Garry Laybourn - photography
Corinne Manoe - make-up
Sean - hair
Jason - hair

References

External links 
Waterloo Sunset
Waterloo Sunset section of the official Barb Jungr website
Matt Backer
Official website
Adrian York biography
Adrian York section of the Roman Holliday website

Stuart Hall section of the 
Geoff Gascoyne
Official website
John Haxby
Official website

Barb Jungr albums
2003 albums